Ann Shirley Wilson (born 29 September 1949), also known as Ann Simmonds is a retired English pentathlete.

Athletics career
She competed at the 1968 and 1972 Summer Olympics in the pentathlon, hurdles and long jump events with the best result of 13th place in the long jump in 1968 and in the pentathlon in 1972. 

Wilson collected three silver and one bronze medals at the British Commonwealth Games in 1970–74. She represented England in the 80 metres hurdles, long jump and high jump, at the 1966 British Empire and Commonwealth Games in Kingston, Jamaica.

Four years later at the 1970 British Commonwealth Games in Edinburgh, Scotland, she won three silver medals in the long jump, high jump and pentathlon and a further four years later she won a bronze medal in the pentathlon at the 1974 British Commonwealth Games at Christchurch, New Zealand.

References

People from Rochford
British pentathletes
English female long jumpers
English female hurdlers
1949 births
Living people
Olympic athletes of Great Britain
Athletes (track and field) at the 1968 Summer Olympics
Athletes (track and field) at the 1972 Summer Olympics
Athletes (track and field) at the 1966 British Empire and Commonwealth Games
Athletes (track and field) at the 1970 British Commonwealth Games
Athletes (track and field) at the 1974 British Commonwealth Games
Commonwealth Games medallists in athletics
Commonwealth Games bronze medallists for England
Commonwealth Games silver medallists for England
Medallists at the 1970 British Commonwealth Games
Medallists at the 1974 British Commonwealth Games